Eva Anna Kotthaus (19 May 1932 in Düsseldorf, Rhine, Prussia, Germany – 22 April 2020) was a German actress.

Filmography
1954: Kein Hüsung - Marieken
1955: Der Teufel vom Mühlenberg - Anne
1955: Sky Without Stars - Anna Kaminski
1956: Love - Monika Ballard
1957: Glücksritter (A Modern Story) - Elisabeth Becker
1957: A Farewell to Arms - Delivery Room Nurse
1958: Jahrgang 21 - Käthe
1959: The Nun's Story - Sister Marie (Sanatorium)
1960: Ein Herz braucht Liebe
1963: Der Sittlichkeitsverbrecher - Betti Egger
1965: Der neue Mann (TV Movie) - Joan Lanier
1972: Anna und Totò (TV Movie)
1972: Jugend einer Studienrätin (TV Movie) - Elisabeth Lewejohann
1978-1995: Derrick (TV Series) - Liane Basler / Hanna Labö / Martha Hauke / Frau Mertens / Frau Scherer / Rose Hagemann / Frau Schlör / Frau Golz
1983:  - Old Teacher (uncredited)
1983: Der Tunnel (TV Movie) - Frau Dürlinger
1988: Land der Väter, Land der Söhne - Maximiliane Kleinert
1991: Der Goldene Schnitt (TV Movie)
1994: Anna Maria – Eine Frau geht ihren Weg (TV Series) - Christine Bogner

References

External links
 
 ZBF Agency Munich 

1932 births
2020 deaths
German television actresses
German film actresses
Actors from Düsseldorf